Kimberley Cooper (born 24 April 1980) is an Australian television actress known for her character of Gypsy Nash on the Australian soap opera Home and Away.

Early life
Kimberley Cooper was born on 24 April 1980 in Sydney, New South Wales, Australia.

Career

Cooper starred in the Australian soap opera Home and Away, from 1998 until 2002, then a small stint in 2011. She played the character of Gypsy Nash in the show. Cooper won the Logie Award for Most Popular New Talent on Australian television in 1999 and the Best Aussie Actress for The Inside Soap Awards, UK, 2000.

In 2002, she was a contestant on Australia's Celebrity Big Brother.

Kimberley left Home and Away before her contract expired. In 2006 she resurfaced in New York City, performing in an Australian production of The Boys to American audiences. She returned to Home and Away on 9 September 2011 and departed again on 13 October 2011.

References

External links

1980 births
Actresses from Sydney
Australian soap opera actresses
Living people
Logie Award winners